Paccha (Quechua for waterfall) is a  mountain in the Vilcabamba mountain range in the Andes of Peru. It is situated in the Cusco Region, La Convención Province, Santa Teresa District. Paccha lies southwest of Pumasillo and south of Pucapuca.

References

Mountains of Peru
Mountains of Cusco Region